Giorgio Diaz de Santillana (30 May 1902 – 8 June 1974) was an Italian-American philosopher and historian of science, born in Rome. He was Professor of the History of Science at the Massachusetts Institute of Technology (MIT).

Biography
A son of the Tunisian-Italian jurist David Santillana and expert on Islamic Law, Giorgio de Santillana was born in Rome and got most of his education there. Santillana moved to the United States in 1936 and became a naturalized U.S. citizen in 1945.  In 1941, he began his academic career at the Massachusetts Institute of Technology, becoming an assistant professor the following year. From 1943 to 1945 he served in the United States Army as a war correspondent.  After the war, in 1945 he returned to MIT and in 1948 was made an associate professor.  In that year, he was married. In 1953, he published an authoritative edition of Galileo Galilei's Dialogue on the Great World Systems.  In 1954, he became a full Professor of the History of Science in the School of Humanities. His Galileo project led him to write, and to publish in 1955, The Crime of Galileo.  In 1969, he published his book Hamlet's Mill, An Essay on Myth and the Frame of Time with Dr. Hertha von Dechend. This book focused on the understanding of the connection between the mythological stories of Pharaonic Egypt, Babylon, Greece, Christianity, etc. and ancient observations pertaining to the stars, planets, and, most notably, the 26,000-year precession of the equinoxes. He died at Beverly, Massachusetts, in 1974.

Bibliography
 Development of rationalism and empiricism. With Edgar Zilsel. Chicago: University of Chicago Press, 1941. (International encyclopedia of unified science Foundations of the unity of science ; v2 no.8).
 Leonardo Da Vinci (1956)
 The Crime of Galileo. Chicago: University of Chicago Press, 1955.
 The Origins of Scientific Thought: from Anaximander to Proclus, 600 BC to 300 AD.  London: Weidenfeld & Nicolson, 1961.
 Reflections on Men and Ideas (1968)
 Hamlet's Mill. With Hertha von Dechend (1915–2001). Boston: Gambit Inc., 1969.
 The Mentor Philosophers: The Age of Adventure: Renaissance Philosophers

Notes

Further reading
 
 Isis, a professional journal of the history of science, included an obituary by friend, Professor Nathan Sivin in Volume 67 (1976), pages 439–443. An excerpt can be found online.

External links

 

1902 births
1974 deaths
20th-century American historians
American male non-fiction writers
Italian emigrants to the United States
Santillana, Giorgio de
Archaeoastronomy
Writers from Rome
People with acquired American citizenship
20th-century American male writers